Crime in the Cards is a book in the Hardy Boys series of young adult novels.  It was first published in 2001.

The Hardy Boys get into a fantasy card game at school.  A teacher confiscates their friend Chet's cards, but the deck is stolen from a locked desk, just when a tournament game is coming up.  Now, the Hardy Boys must find the thief before it is too late.

The Hardy Boys books
2001 American novels
Novels set in schools
2001 children's books